Wittmackia canaliculata is a species of plant in the family Bromeliaceae. This species is endemic to the State of Bahia in Brazil.

References

canaliculata
Flora of Brazil
Plants described in 1999